Cold Brook is a former railroad station in the Boiceville section of the town of Olive, Ulster County, New York, United States. Located on Cold Brook Road, just north of New York State Route 28A next to Esopus Creek, Cold Brook station served the New York Central Railroad's Catskill Mountain Branch, formerly the Ulster and Delaware Railroad.

The station replaced a flag stop at Cold Brook Bridge and became the primary station for Boiceville on June 8, 1913, when the railroad abandoned the alignment and station through Boiceville for construction of the Ashokan Reservoir. The Ulster and Delaware commenced construction on a new station depot in June 1915. Construction was completed .

The New York Central Railroad ended passenger service on the Catskill Mountain Branch on March 31, 1954, and despite being given permission to demolish the station in April 1955, the station continues to stand. The station is also an access point for the Ashokan Rail Trail, a rail trail runs from Cold Brook to West Hurley.

Bibliography

References

External links
 Catskill Mountain Railroad

Railway stations in the Catskill Mountains
Former New York Central Railroad stations
Railway stations in Ulster County, New York
Former railway stations in New York (state)
Railway stations closed in 1954
1954 disestablishments in New York (state)